Douglas John Warlow (born 13 February 1939) is a Welsh former dual-code international rugby union, and professional rugby league footballer who played in the 1960s and 1970s.

Background
Warlow was born in Dafen, Carmarthenshire, Wales.

Playing career

International honours
John Warlow won a cap for Wales (RU) while at Llanelli RFC in 1962 against Ireland, and won caps for Great Britain (RL) while at St. Helens in 1964 against France, in the 1968 Rugby League World Cup against New Zealand, and France, and while at Widnes in 1971 against France (two matches), and New Zealand.

Championship final appearances
John Warlow played right-, i.e. number 12, in St. Helens' 35-12 victory over Halifax in the Championship Final during the 1965–66 season at Station Road, Swinton on Saturday 28 May 1966, in front of a crowd of 30,165.

Challenge Cup Final appearances
John Warlow played right-, i.e. number 12, in St. Helens' 21-2 victory over Wigan in the 1966 Challenge Cup Final during the 1965–66 season at Wembley Stadium, London on Saturday 21 May 1966, in front of a crowd of 98,536.

County Cup Final appearances
John Warlow played right-, i.e. number 10, in St. Helens' 12-4 victory over Swinton in the 1964 Lancashire County Cup Final during the 1964–65 season at Central Park, Wigan on Saturday 24 October 1964, played left-, i.e. number 8, in the 2-2 draw with Warrington in the 1967 Lancashire County Cup Final during the 1967–68 season at Central Park, Wigan on played left-, i.e. number 8, in the 2-2 draw with Warrington in the 1967 Lancashire County Cup Final during the 1967–68 season at Central Park, Wigan on Saturday 7 October 1967, played left-, and scored a try in the 13-10 victory over Warrington in the 1967 Lancashire County Cup Final replay during the 1967–68 season at Station Road, Swinton on Saturday 2 December 1967, played left- in the 30-2 victory over Oldham in the 1968 Lancashire County Cup Final during the 1968–69 season at Central Park, Wigan on Friday 25 October 1968, and played left- in Widnes 8-15 defeat by Wigan in the 1971 Lancashire County Cup Final during the 1970–71 season at Knowsley Road, St. Helens on Saturday 28 August 1971.

BBC2 Floodlit Trophy Final appearances
John Warlow played left-, i.e. number 8, in St. Helens' 4-7 defeat by Wigan in the 1968 BBC2 Floodlit Trophy Final during the 1968-69 season at Central Park, Wigan on Tuesday 17 December 1968, and played right-, i.e. number 10, in Widnes' 0-5 defeat by Leigh in the 1972 BBC2 Floodlit Trophy Final during the 1972-73 season at Central Park, Wigan on Tuesday 19 December 1972.

Honoured at St Helens RFC
John Warlow is a St Helens RFC Hall of Fame inductee.

References

External links
!Great Britain Statistics at englandrl.co.uk (statistics currently missing due to not having appeared for both Great Britain, and England)
Profile at saints.org.uk
Statistics at rugby.widnes.tv

1939 births
Living people
Dual-code rugby internationals
Felinfoel RFC players
Great Britain national rugby league team players
Llanelli RFC players
Rochdale Hornets players
Rugby league players from Carmarthenshire
Rugby league props
Rugby union players from Dafen
Rugby union props
St Helens R.F.C. players
Wales international rugby union players
Wales national rugby league team players
Welsh rugby league players
Welsh rugby union players
Widnes Vikings players